Angelica Olsson (born 27 November 1991) is a Swedish former competitive figure skater. She is the 2010 Nordic silver medalist and a two-time Swedish national bronze medalist. She was sent to the 2009 World Junior Championships in Sofia, Bulgaria but did not qualify for the free skate. At the 2010 World Junior Championships in The Hague, Netherlands, she placed 12th in the short program, 19th in the free skate, and 17th overall. She is the daughter of a figure skating coach, Susanne Olsson, and the elder sister of figure skater Isabelle Olsson.

Programs

Competitive highlights 
JGP: Junior Grand Prix

References

External links 
 

1991 births
Swedish female single skaters
Living people
People from Karlskrona
Sportspeople from Blekinge County
21st-century Swedish women